Spain took part in the Eurovision Song Contest 1970. The country was represented by Julio Iglesias with the song "Gwendolyne". The entry was selected through a national final.

Before Eurovision

Festival de la Canción Española 
Festival de la Canción Española was the national final organized by TVE that took place at the Palau Nacional in Barcelona from February 12 to 14, hosted by Laurita Valenzuela and Joaquín Prat. It was the second and final edition of Festival de la Canción Española. Twenty songs competed over three shows, with the winner song being decided upon through regional jury voting.

Competing entries 
Twenty compositions were selected to compete in the national final by the broadcaster, with two designated acts per song. As regulations only allowed a maximum of three performers and three backing vocalists, groups were able to compete by designating one or two vocalists, with the rest of the group featuring as backing vocalists. Some performers that had been initially selected withdrew or were replaced before the live shows.

Semi-finals 
The semi-finals took place on 12 and 13 February 1970. On both shows, ten songs were first performed by one of its assigned singers, and then again by the other singer. After the second semi-final, ten songs qualified for the final through jury voting from 15 regional Radio Nacional de España, TVE and Radio Peninsular studios, each distributing five votes among their favourite songs. The number of votes received by each song was announced, but were not reflected in the official TV excerpts from semi-final 2, or in contemporary reports.

Final 
The final took place on 14 February 1970. As in the semi-finals, each song was performed twice by its different performers. In the event that the winner song had two Spanish singers, the juries would vote again to decide which artist would perform the song at the Eurovision Song Contest; if the song was shared with a foreign artist, the Spanish singer would become the Eurovision representative. 15 regional juries, each distributing five votes among their favourite songs, selected "Gwendolyne" as the winning song. As Rosy Armen was a French singer, Julio Iglesias was automatically chosen as the Spanish artist for Eurovision.

At Eurovision
Julio Iglesias was the 9th to perform in the running order, following Luxembourg and preceding Monaco. He received 8 points for his performance, tying for the fourth place with France and Switzerland.

Voting

Notes

References

1970
Countries in the Eurovision Song Contest 1970
Eurovision